A list of Bangladeshi films released in 1998.

Releases

See also

1998 in Bangladesh

References

Film
Bangladesh
 1998